Hermann von Helmholtz (1821 – 1894), German physician and physicist who made significant contributions to several widely varied areas of modern science, is the eponym of the topics listed below.

Astronomy
11573 Helmholtz
 Kelvin–Helmholtz mechanism
 Helmholtz (lunar crater)

Mathematics, physics and chemistry
 Gibbs–Helmholtz equation
 Helmholtz coil
 Helmholtz condition
 Helmholtz decomposition
Helmholtz–Hodge decomposition
Helmholtz–Leray decomposition
 Helmholtz equation
Kirchhoff–Helmholtz integral
 Helmholtz flow
 Helmholtz free energy
 Helmholtz free entropy
 Kelvin–Helmholtz instability
 Helmholtz layer
 Helmholtz minimum dissipation theorem
 Helmholtz reciprocity
 Helmholtz resonance
 Helmholtz theorem (classical mechanics)
 Generalized Helmholtz theorem
 Helmholtz's theorems
 Helmholtz–Kohlrausch effect
 Gibbs–Helmholtz equation
 Helmholtz-Smoluchowski equation
 Smith-Helmholtz invariant

Music
 Helmholtz pitch notation
 Helmholtz temperament
 Helmholtz-Ellis notation

Other
 Helmholtz Association of German Research Centres
 Helmholtz machine
 Helmholtz–Thévenin theorem

Physiology
 Young–Helmholtz theory

Helmholtz
Helmholtz
Named after